Etla District is located in the north of the Valles Centrales Region of the State of Oaxaca, Mexico.

Municipalities

The district includes the following municipalities:
 
Guadalupe Etla
Magdalena Apasco
Nazareno Etla
Reyes Etla
San Agustín Etla
San Andrés Zautla
San Felipe Tejalapam
San Francisco Telixtlahuaca
San Jerónimo Sosola
San Juan Bautista Atatlahuca
San Juan Bautista Guelache
San Juan Bautista Jayacatlán
San Juan del Estado
San Lorenzo Cacaotepec
San Pablo Etla
San Pablo Huitzo
Santa María Peñoles
Santiago Suchilquitongo
Santiago Tenango
Santiago Tlazoyaltepec
Santo Tomás Mazaltepec
Soledad Etla
Villa de Etla

See also
Municipalities of Oaxaca

References

Districts of Oaxaca
Valles Centrales de Oaxaca